Three Rivers College is a public community college in Poplar Bluff, Missouri. It was founded in 1966 when voters in the counties of Butler, Carter, Ripley, and Wayne approved the taxing district of Butler, Carter, Ripley, and Wayne counties.

Three Rivers is governed by a six-person board of trustees elected by residents in the college's taxing district. The college has an  campus in Poplar Bluff, Missouri with full-service locations in Dexter, Kennett, and Sikeston, and in-district locations in Doniphan, Caruthersville, Piedmont, Portageville, New Madrid, and Van Buren, and offers classes at various sites and high schools throughout the region. Three Rivers also participates in the Cape College Center alongside Mineral Area College and Southeast Missouri State University. The school is accredited by the Higher Learning Commission.

The college officially changed its name from Three Rivers Community College to Three Rivers College in 2017. It enrolled 2,965 in 2019.

Athletics
Three Rivers competes as a member of the NJCAA in the Missouri Community College Athletic Conference.

Its most famous athletic alumnus is Latrell Sprewell, who played basketball for Three Rivers before playing Division I basketball at Alabama.

Gene Bess, the men's basketball coach, has the most wins of any junior college basketball coach.

References

External links
 Official website

 
Two-year colleges in the United States
Buildings and structures in Butler County, Missouri
Education in Butler County, Missouri
Education in Stoddard County, Missouri
Education in Dunklin County, Missouri
Education in New Madrid County, Missouri
Education in Scott County, Missouri
Education in Cape Girardeau County, Missouri
Community colleges in Missouri
NJCAA athletics
1966 establishments in Missouri